Benson Mhlongo (born 9 November 1980) is a South African former professional soccer player who played as a  defender and midfielder.

He was part of the South African squad at the 2008 African Cup of Nations.

International goals

External links

1980 births
Living people
People from Alexandra, Gauteng
South African soccer players
South Africa international soccer players
Association football midfielders
Association football defenders
Bidvest Wits F.C. players
Mamelodi Sundowns F.C. players
Orlando Pirates F.C. players
Platinum Stars F.C. players
Polokwane City F.C. players
Association football utility players
2009 FIFA Confederations Cup players
2004 African Cup of Nations players
2008 Africa Cup of Nations players
Sportspeople from Gauteng